Rob Palmer may refer to:

Rob Palmer (commentator), sports announcer and footballer
Rob Palmer (ice hockey, born 1952), ice hockey player for the Chicago Blackhawks
Rob Palmer (ice hockey, born 1956), ice hockey player for the Los Angeles Kings and New Jersey Devils
Rob Palmer (presenter) (born 1975), presenter of TV series Better Homes and Gardens

See also
Robert Palmer (disambiguation)